Wiesendangen is a railway station in the Swiss canton of Zurich and municipality of Wiesendangen. The station is located on the Winterthur–Romanshorn railway line. It is an intermediate stop on Zurich S-Bahn services S24 and S30.

References 

Wiesendangen
Wiesendangen